SPI-3 or System Packet Interface Level 3 is the name of a chip-to-chip, channelized, packet interface widely used in high-speed communications devices.  It was proposed by PMC-Sierra based on their PL-3 interface to the Optical Internetworking Forum and adopted in June 2000.  PL-3 was developed by PMC-Sierra in conjunction with the SATURN Development Group.

Applications
It was designed to be used in systems that support OC-48 SONET interfaces .  A typical application of SPI-3 is to connect a framer device to a network processor.  It has been widely adopted by the high speed networking marketplace.

Technical details
The interface consists of (per direction):
 32 TTL signals for the data path
 8 TTL signals for control
 one TTL signal for clock
 8 TTL signals for optional additional multi-channel status

There are several clocking options.  The interface operates around 100 MHz.  Implementations of SPI-3 (PL-3) have been produced which allow somewhat higher clock rates.  This is important when overhead bytes are added to incoming packets.

SPI-3 in the marketplace
SPI-3 (and PL-3) was a highly successful interface with many semiconductor devices produced to it.

See also
 System Packet Interface
 SPI-4.2

External links
  OIF Interoperability Agreements

Network protocols